Silvia Noemí del Valle Sayago (2 March 1955 – 12 December 2021) was an Argentine politician. A member of the Civic Front for Santiago she served in the Argentine Chamber of Deputies from 10 December 2021 until her sudden death due to organ failure two days later, on 12 December 2021.

References

1955 births
2021 deaths
21st-century Argentine politicians
21st-century Argentine women politicians
Members of the Argentine Chamber of Deputies elected in Santiago del Estero
Women members of the Argentine Chamber of Deputies
People from Santiago del Estero
Members of the Chamber of Deputies of Santiago del Estero